Najwan Halimi (Jawi: نجوان حليمي; born 8 May 1985) is a Malaysian politician currently serving as a member of the Selangor State Legislative Assembly for Kota Anggerik. He is also the current Shah Alam Parti Keadilan Rakyat deputy chief and was former chief of Selangor Parti Keadilan Rakyat Youth wing. Najwan is one of the defence witness called by the Malaysian High Court in Anwar Ibrahim's second sodomy trial. He is also the designer of the flag Sang Saka Malaya that became controversial during the 55th anniversary of Malaysia's independence in 2012.

Personal background 
He grew up in Shah Alam and Subang Jaya, Selangor. He received his primary education at Sekolah Kebangsaan Raja Muda in Shah Alam and secondary education at Sekolah Menengah Sains Hulu Selangor in Hulu Selangor and had his university education at Universiti Tenaga Nasional, graduated with a bachelor's degree in mechanical engineering. He was actively involved in student activism during his campus days and was known as a skilled writer and an outspoken student leader.

After leaving university, Najwan joined the Malaysian Administrative and Diplomatic Service and served as Assistant Secretary at the Ministry of Transport.

In 2015, Najwan joined the Rejimen Askar Wataniah as a reservist after completing one month of training in June 2015.

Political career 
In 2010, Najwan joined Parti Keadilan Rakyat and he was subsequently appointed as Deputy Information Chief for the party youth wing. During the 13th Malaysian general election, Najwan was seen actively campaigning for PKR advisor, Anwar Ibrahim for the parliamentary seat of Permatang Pauh, Penang. In 2014, Najwan was one of the candidates for Kelana Jaya Youth Chief in the PKR party elections.

In 2018, Najwan won his first attempt in the electoral campaign in 2018 for the Selangor state seat Kota Anggerik which helped the Pakatan Harapan coalition defeated Barisan Nasional and Parti Islam Se-Malaysia. Najwan defeated PAS candidate, Ahmad Dusuki Abd Rani and BN candidate Jumaeah Masdi with a majority of 17,004.

Controversies
In 2012, a flag designed by Najwan in 2007 named Sang Saka Malaya was carried by supporters of Himpunan Janji Demokrasi with the red and white flag design together with the crescent moon and a star with 11 vertices in the eve of Malaysia's independence celebration. The flag became the central point in the national flag controversy in 2012.

Anwar Ibrahim's Sodomy Trial
In 2011, Najwan was called by the Malaysian court as a witness for the Anwar Ibrahim's second sodomy trial due to his past relationship with Saiful Bukhari Azlan. According to him, Saiful was his batch mate during his time at UNITEN and both were close with each other and shared the same interest in politics. Based on a report by Free Malaysia Today, Najwan testified that Saiful was an ardent supporter of Barisan Nasional and the government and had expressed his dislike towards Anwar Ibrahim and that he (Saiful) although has principles, craves attention and publicity. Najwan was shocked upon learning the admission of Saiful to Anwar's office, serving as his personal secretary. In an interview by BBC, Najwan had suggested that Saiful Bukhari was an implant in-order to sabotage the reputation of the former opposition leader.

Career
Upon graduating, Najwan had a brief stint working as an administrator with a federal ministry before working with the then opposition leader, Anwar Ibrahim. His secondment in the leader of the opposition's office lasted for four years. During his time working with the opposition leader, Najwan was among the staffs that organised and arranged Anwar Ibrahim's daily schedules and important appointments. In 2015, Najwan was appointed as the Deputy Director of Selangor State Sports Council (Majlis Sukan Negeri Selangor) in-charge of the youth development portfolio. He was instrumental in Selangor's participation in the 2016 SUKMA Games in Sarawak. At the end of the SUKMA games Selangor led the medal tally with 59 golds, 73 silvers and 64 bronzes.

Election results

References

People's Justice Party (Malaysia) politicians
Malaysian people of Malay descent
Malaysian Muslims
University of Putra Malaysia alumni
1985 births
Living people
People from Selangor